Coatepec Nahuatl is a variety of Nahuatl of southwestern Mexico State and Guerrero spoken by 1,400 people.

Language
It is also known as Coatepec Aztec and Náhuatl de Coatepec. The language is spoken in central Mexico along the border of Mexico and Guerrero states, west of Iguala, Guerrero. It is especially strong in Coatepec Costales and Chilacachapa, and is spoken as far west as Acapetlahuaya and Sultepec. It is written in the Latin script and is predominantly spoken by older adults with 15 monolinguals.

The General History of the Things of New Spain in the Florentine Codex, by Fray Bernardino de Sahagún was written in Coatepec Nahuatl and Spanish.

References

External links 

Nahuatl, Central Puebla
Nahuatl